Highway 66 is a north–south highway in the Jezreel Valley in northern Israel. It extends along the eastern lowlands below the Menashe Heights and the Carmel. In the past the road continued south to Jenin, but today it ends at checkpoint.

The northern section of the highway was constructed in 1929 to allow access to Tel Megiddo archaeological site for the anticipated visit of John D. Rockefeller Jr. The southern section was constructed in the 1930s, and the highway opened to general traffic between Haifa and Jenin in 1936 as a bypass road avoiding Nazareth.

Interchanges & Junctions (South to North)

Places of interest on Highway 66 
 Tel Megiddo National Park

See also 
 List of highways in Israel

References

66